Christianity is the third largest religion in Pakistan, making up about 1.27% of the population according to the 2017 Census. Of these, approximately half are Catholic and half Protestant (primarily Anglican and Presbyterian). A small number of Eastern Orthodox Christians, and Oriental Orthodox Christians also live in Pakistan.

Around 75 percent of Pakistan's Christians are rural Punjabi Christians, while some speak Sindhi and Gujarati, with the remainder being the upper and middle class Goan Christians and Anglo-Indians.

As Punjabi Christians are mainly Dalit Christians—descendants of lower-caste Hindus who converted during the colonial era in India—their dire socio-economic conditions facilitate religious discrimination; for example, it is estimated that Christians fill about 80% of the manual sewer cleaning jobs in the whole of Pakistan.

History

Thomas the Apostle is credited with the arrival of Christianity to the Indian subcontinent, establishing the community of Saint Thomas Christians on the Malabar Coast; Saint Thomas Christian crosses (Mar Thoma Sleeva) have been found all over the Indian subcontinent, including one near the city of Taxila in what is now Pakistan.

In 1745, the Bettiah Christians, the northern Indian subcontinent's oldest surviving Christian community, was established by the Order of Friars Minor Capuchin under the patronage of King Dhurup Singh; the Hindustan Prefecture was raised in 1769 at Patna and later shifted to Agra, which was elevated to the status of a Vicariate in 1820. The Capuchins, through their Agra Diocese and Allahabad Diocese, expanded their ministry and established in the 1800s Catholic churches in colonial India's northern provinces including Rajasthan, UP, CP, Bihar and Punjab, the latter of which now includes Pakistan.

In 1877, on Saint Thomas' Day at Westminster Abbey, London, Rev. Thomas Valpy French was appointed the first Anglican Bishop of Lahore, a large diocese of the Church of India, Burma and Ceylon, which included all of the Punjab, then under British rule in colonial India, and remained so until 1887; during this period he also opened the Divinity College, Lahore in 1870. Rev. Thomas Patrick Hughes served as a Church Missionary Society missionary at Peshawar (1864–84), and became an oriental scholar, and compiled a 'Dictionary of Islam' (1885).

The Christians of colonial India were active in the Indian National Congress and wider Indian independence movement, being collectively represented in the All India Conference of Indian Christians, which advocated for swaraj and opposed the partition of India. The meeting of the All India Conference of Indian Christians in Lahore in December 1922, which had a large attendance of Punjabis, resolved that the clergymen of the Church in India should be drawn from the ranks of Indians, rather than foreigners. The AICIC also stated that Indian Christians would not tolerate any discrimination based on race or skin colour. Following the death of K. T. Paul of Salem, the principal of Forman Christian College in Lahore S. K. Datta became the president of the All India Conference of Indian Christians, representing the Indian Christian community at the Second Round Table Conference, where he agreed with Mahatma Gandhi's views on minorities and Depressed Classes. On 30 October 1945, the All India Conference of Indian Christians formed a joint committee with the Catholic Union of India that passed a resolution in which, "in the future constitution of India, the profession, practice and propagation of religion should be guaranteed and that a change of religion should not involve any civil or political disability." This joint committee enabled the Christians in colonial India to stand united, and in front of the British Parliamentary Delegation "the committee members unanimously supported the move for independence and expressed complete confidence in the future of the community in India." The office for this joint committee was opened in Delhi, in which the Vice-Chancellor of Andhra University M. Rahnasamy served as president and B.L. Rallia Ram of Lahore served as General Secretary. Six members of the joint committee were elected to the Minorities Committee of the Constituent Assembly. In its meeting on 16 April 1947 and 17 April 1947, the joint committee of the All India Conference of Indian Christians and Catholic Union of India prepared a 13-point memorandum that was sent to the Constituent Assembly of India, which asked for religious freedom for both organisations and individuals.

When Pakistan was created on 14 August 1947, the organization and activities of the Christian community changed drastically; the Catholic Union of India granted independence to its branches in Sind and Baluchistan in its Second Annual General Meeting in Bangalore in October 1947. Some Christians in Punjab and Sindh had been quite active after 1945 in their support for Muhammad Ali Jinnah's Muslim League. Even before the final phase of the movement, leading Indian Christians like Pothan Joseph had rendered valuable services as journalists and propagandists of the Muslim League. Jinnah had repeatedly promised all citizens of Pakistan complete equality of citizenship, but this promise was not kept by his successors. Pakistan became an Islamic Republic in 1956, making Islam the source of legislation and cornerstone of the national identity, while guaranteeing freedom of religion and equal citizenship to all citizens. In the mass population exchanges that occurred between Pakistan and India upon independence due to conflict between Muslims and followers of Indian religions, most Hindus and nearly all Sikhs fled the country. Pakistani Punjab is now over 2% Christian, with very few Hindus and Sikhs left. Christians have made some contributions to the Pakistani national life. Pakistan's first non-Muslim Chief Justice of Pakistan Supreme Court was Justice A. R. Cornelius. Pakistani Christians also distinguished themselves as great fighter pilots in the Pakistan Air Force. Notable amongst them are Cecil Chaudhry, Peter O'Reilly and Mervyn L Middlecoat. Christians have also contributed as educationists, doctors, lawyers and businessmen. One of Pakistan's cricketers, Yousuf Youhana, was born Christian, but later converted to Islam, taking the Islamic name Mohammad Yousuf. In Britain, the bishop emeritus of Rochester Michael Nazir-Ali is a Pakistani Christian.

In 2016, it was reported that Pakistan Electronic Media Regulatory Authority (PEMRA) had banned all of the Christian television stations. PEMRA doesn't allow landing rights for religious content, allowing airing of Christian messages only on Easter and Christmas.

Since 1996, the small community of Eastern Orthodox Christians in Pakistan was placed under the ecclesiastical jurisdiction of the newly formed Orthodox Metropolitanate of Hong Kong and Southeast Asia that was set up by the decision of the Holy Synod of the Ecumenical Patriarchate of Constantinople. In 2008, the Diocese was divided, and Pakistan came under the jurisdiction of newly formed Eastern Orthodox Metropolitanate of Singapore and South Asia.

Deterioration of relations

According to journalist Pamela Constable, in the 1980s and 1990s tensions between Christians and Muslims in Pakistan began to "fester". Constable credits the Soviet war in Afghanistan, the rise of military dictator General Mohammed Zia ul-Haq, and the influence of stricter religious teachings coming from the Gulf states as catalysts for the change. After the 9/11 attacks on the US, things grew worse with "many Pakistani Muslims" seeing the American response to the attacks "as a foreign plot to defame their faith."

Pakistan's Christian community developed a "growing sense of concern", particularly over the strict blasphemy laws – which restricts any insults against the Islamic prophet Muhammad and makes the crime punishable by death – which many activists viewed as "being abused to target religious minorities. In the 1990s, some Christians were arrested on charges of blasphemy, and for protesting that appeared to insult Islam. John Joseph, a bishop in Faisalabad, committed suicide to protest the execution of a Christian man on blasphemy charges.

In 2009, a series of attacks killed eight Christians in Gojra, including four women and a child. In 2013, a suicide bombing at a Church in Peshawar left more than 100 people dead, and a series of attacks at churches in Lahore in 2015 left 14 dead. On March 27, 2016 over seventy people were killed when a suicide bomber targeting Christians celebrating Easter (though the majority of victims were Muslim in this instance) attacked a playground in Lahore.

Demographics 

While Christianity in Pakistan is growing fast, it is growing more slowly than the population as a whole, causing it to decline in percentage terms. This is due to low fertility rates among Pakistani Christians. Today, most Pakistani Christians live in Northern Punjab.

Apart from Catholics, Christians of other denominations re-organized themselves, in India, into the Churches of North and South India respectively, and as the Church of Pakistan in 1970. Politically, groups like the Pakistan Christian Congress have arisen. The New Apostolic Church also has followers in Pakistan.

The Church of Jesus Christ of Latter-day Saints (LDS Church) reports over 4,000 members in 13 congregations throughout Pakistan. LDS members are most prevalent in Islamabad, Lahore and Karachi.

According to the Pakistan's National Council for Justice and Peace (NCJP) report 2001 the average literacy rate among Christians is 34 percent compared to the national average of 46.56 percent.

Persecution

After the partition of India and the formation of Pakistan in 1947, many Sikhs were forced to migrate to an independent India. Many Christians worked under Sikh landlords and when they departed the western parts of the Punjab region, the Government of Pakistan appropriated Sikh property to Muslims arriving from East Punjab. This caused over 300,000 Christians in Pakistan to become homeless. On top of that, rogue Muslims threatened Christians that Pakistan was made for Muslims only and that if Christians wanted to stay there, they had to live a life of servitude and perform sanitation work. Some Christians were therefore murdered for refusing to pick up garbage. In 1951, seventy-two Muslims were charged with the murder of eleven Christians after communal riots over agricultural land erupted.

Many churches built during the colonial Indian period, prior to the partition, remain locked, with the Pakistani government refusing to hand them over to the Christian community. Others have been victims of church arsons or demolitions. In 1971, East Pakistan became independent as Bangladesh, and the majority of Pakistan's Hindus, who lived in Bangladesh, were severed from Pakistan. Pakistan became a culturally monolithic, increasingly Islamic state, with smaller religious minorities than ever.

With the governments of Zulfikar Ali Bhutto and Zia ul-Haq, more stringently Islamic laws transformed Pakistan. Conversion to other faiths than Islam is not prohibited by law, but culture and social pressures do not favour such conversions. Muslims who change their faith to Christianity, are subject to societal pressure. Extremely controversial were the blasphemy laws, which made it treacherous for non-Muslims to express themselves without being accused of being un-Islamic. Zia also introduced the Sharia as a basis for lawmaking, reinforced by Nawaz Sharif in 1991. Coerced conversions to Islam from Christianity are a major source of concern for Pakistani Christians, and the minority faces threats, harassment and intimidation tactics from extremists.

Discrimination in the Constitution
 
Christians, along with other non-Muslim minorities, are discriminated against in the Constitution of Pakistan. Non-Muslims are barred from becoming President or Prime Minister. Furthermore, they are barred from being judges in the Federal Shariat Court, which has the power to strike down any law deemed un-Islamic. In 2019, Naveed Amir, a Christian member of National assembly moved a bill to amend the article 41 and 91 of the Constitution, which would allow non-Muslims to become Prime Minister and President of Pakistan. However, Pakistan's parliament blocked the bill

In 2019, a Christian journalist quit the channel Dunya News after she was allegedly persecuted for her faith by co-workers and insulted for not converting to Islam.

Blasphemy Laws

Several hundred Christians, along with Muslims themselves (though much fewer in comparison), have been prosecuted under Pakistan's blasphemy laws, and death sentences have been handed out to at least a dozen.

Pakistani law mandates that any "blasphemies" of the Quran are to be met with punishment. On July 28, 1994, Amnesty International urged Pakistan's Prime Minister, Benazir Bhutto to change the law because it was being used to terrorize religious minorities. She tried but was unsuccessful. However, she modified the laws to make them more moderate. Her changes were reversed by the Nawaz Sharif administration. Some people accused of blasphemy have been killed in prison or shot dead in court, and even if pardoned, may remain in danger from imams in their local village.

Ayub Masih, a Christian, was convicted of blasphemy and sentenced to death in 1998. He was accused by a neighbor of stating that he supported British writer Salman Rushdie, author of The Satanic Verses. Lower appeals courts upheld the conviction. However, before the Pakistan Supreme Court, his lawyer was able to prove that the accuser had used the conviction to force Masih's family off their land and then acquired control of the property. Masih has been released.

On September 22, 2006, a Pakistani Christian named Shahid Masih was arrested and jailed for allegedly violating Islamic "blasphemy laws" in the country of Pakistan. He is at present held in confinement and has expressed fear of reprisals by Islamic fundamentalists. (Note that the name "Masih", which comes from Arabic المسيحيين Al-Masihiyyin, "Christians", is a common surname in Pakistan and India among Christians.)

In November 2010, Asia Bibi was sentenced to death by hanging for "blasphemy"; the sentence has to be upheld in higher court before it can be executed. Bibi was acquitted in 2018.

In August 2012, Rimsha Masih, a Christian girl, reportedly 11 or 14 years old, and an illiterate with mental disabilities was accused of blasphemy for burning pages from a book containing Quranic verses. The allegation came from a Muslim cleric who himself has subsequently been accused by the police of framing the girl. The girl, and later the cleric, were both arrested and released on bail.

In July 2013 Shagufta Kausar and Shafqat Emmanuel, a Christian couple, were arrested and charged with blasphemy for allegedly sending a text message in English, that was considered offensive of Mohammed. Both members of the couple are illiterate and do not speak English. Sentenced to death, they remained on death row for eight years before their sentence was overturned. Unable to remain in Pakistan, for lack of safety, they were granted asylum in a European country. 

In 2018, Amoon, 42, and Qaiser Ayub, 45, both Christians, were convicted of blasphemy and given the death penalty. Authorities were alerted a WordPress.com blog in 2011 that violated the country's blasphemy laws. The blog, allegedly created by a Muslim man close to the brothers who argued with them over their sister, publicly displayed their contact information, and was used in their conviction, despite acknowledging that anyone could've created the blog and both brothers' denying their part in the blog's creation. The courts upheld the verdict in sentence in 2022.

Forced conversions

In October 2020, the Pakistani High Court upheld the validity of a forced marriage between 44-year-old Ali Azhar and 13-year-old Christian Arzoo Raja. Raja was abducted by Azhar, forcibly wed to Azhar and then forcibly converted to Islam by Azhar. Human rights organizations estimate that upwards of 1,000 Christian, Hindu, and Sikh girls are abducted each year. A large portion of them are then forced to convert to Islam.

Forced displacements
Since 2014, the Capital Development Authority (CDA), a public benefit corporation responsible for providing municipal services in Islamabad, has been targeting and demolishing illegal slums who are largely occupied by Christians in the city. The Supreme Court put on hold the demolitions and ordered from the CDA a written justification to it. The CDA's replied that "Most of these katchi abadies [slums] are under the occupation of the Christian community." "It seems this pace of occupation of land by Christian community may increase. Removal of katchi abadies is very urgent to provide [a] better environment to the citizen[s] of Islamabad and to protect the beauty of Islamabad ." Various human rights activists condemned the response.

On November 9, 2020 Yasmin Masih and her son Usman Masih, both Christians, were murdered in Ahmad Nagar Chattha by Hussain Shakoor, a Muslim.

In May 2021, Muslim nurses in Mental Government Hospital in Lahore occupied the Christian hospital chapel and raised Islamic slogans. Christian nurses, who use the chapel daily for prayer, pleaded for their protection.

Muslim extremist violence against Christians

Christians in Pakistan report being targeted by Tehrik-i-Taliban Pakistan.

On September 25, 2002, unidentified Muslim gunmen shot dead six people at a Christian charity in Karachi's central business district. They entered the third-floor offices of the Institute for Peace and Justice (IPJ) and shot their victims in the head. All of the victims were Pakistani Christians. Karachi police chief Tariq Jamil said the victims had their hands tied and their mouths had been covered with tape. On 25 December 2002, several days after an Islamic cleric called for Muslims to kill Christians, two burqa-clad Muslim gunmen tossed a grenade into a Presbyterian church during a Christian sermon in Chianwala in east Pakistan, killing three girls.

After the Karachi killings, Shahbaz Bhatti, the head of the All Pakistan Minority Alliance, told BBC News Online, "We have become increasingly victimised since the launch of the US-led international War on Terror. It is, therefore, the responsibility of the international community to ensure that the government protects us."

In November 2005, 3,000 militant Islamists attacked Christians in Sangla Hill in Pakistan and destroyed Roman Catholic, Salvation Army and United Presbyterian churches. The attack was over allegations of violation of blasphemy laws by a Pakistani Christian named Yousaf Masih. The attacks were condemned by some political parties in Pakistan. However, Pakistani Christians have expressed disappointment that they have not received justice. Samson Dilawar, a parish priest in Sangla Hill, said the police have not committed to trial any of those arrested for committing the assaults, and the Pakistani government did not inform the Christian community that a judicial inquiry was underway by a local judge. He said that Muslim clerics still "make hateful speeches about Christians" and "continue insulting Christians and our faith".

In February 2006, churches and Christian schools were targeted in protests over publication of the Jyllands-Posten cartoons in Denmark, leaving two elderly women injured and many homes and much property destroyed. Some of the mobs were stopped by police, but not all. On June 5, 2006, a Pakistani Christian stonemason named Nasir Ashraf was working near Lahore when he drank water from a public facility using a glass chained to the facility. He was immediately assaulted by Muslims for "polluting the glass". A mob gathered and beat Ashraf, calling him a "Christian dog". Bystanders encouraged the beating, saying it was a "good" deed that would help the attackers get into heaven. Ashraf was hospitalized. In August 2006, a church and Christian homes were attacked in a village outside of Lahore in a land dispute. Three Christians were seriously injured and one reported missing after about 35 Muslims burned buildings, desecrated Bibles and attacked Christians. Based, in part, on such incidents, Pakistan was recommended by the U.S. Commission on International Religious Freedom (USCIRF) in May 2006 to be designated as a "Country of Particular Concern" (CPC) by the Department of State.

In July 2008,  a mob stormed a Protestant church during a prayer service on the outskirts of Pakistan's largest city, Karachi, denouncing the Christians as "infidels" and injuring several, including a pastor.

The 2009 Gojra riots was a series of violent pogroms against Christian minorities by Muslims. In June 2009, International Christian Concern reported the rape and killing of a Christian man in Pakistan, for refusing to convert to Islam.

In March 2011, Shahbaz Bhatti was killed by gunmen after he spoke out against Pakistan's blasphemy laws. The UK increased financial aid to the country, sparking criticism of British foreign secretary William Hague. Cardinal Keith O’Brien stated, "To increase aid to the Pakistan government when religious freedom is not upheld and those who speak up for religious freedom are gunned down is tantamount to an anti-Christian foreign policy." The Catholic Church in Pakistan requested that Pope Benedict declare martyrdom of Shahbaz Bhatti.

At least 20 people, including police officials, were wounded as 500 Muslim demonstrators attacked the Christian community in Gujranwala city on 29 April 2011, Minorities Concern of Pakistan has learnt. During a press conference in Karachi, the largest city of Pakistan, on 30 May 2011, Maulana Abdul Rauf Farooqi and other clerics of Jamiat-Ulema-e-Islam quoted “immoral Biblical stories” and demanded to ban the Bible. Maulana Farooqi said, “Our lawyers are preparing to ask the court to ban the book.”

On 23 September 2012, a mob of protesters in Mardan, angry at the anti Islamic film Innocence of Muslims, reportedly "set on fire the church, St Paul's high school, a library, a computer laboratory and houses of four clergymen, including Bishop Peter Majeed." and went on to rough up Zeeshan Chand, the pastor's son. On 12 October 2012, Ryan Stanton, a Christian boy of 16 went into hiding after being accused of blasphemy and after his home was ransacked by a crowd. Stanton stated that he had been framed because he had rebuffed pressures to convert to Islam.

In March 2013, Muslims attacked a Christian neighbourhood in Lahore, where more than 100 houses were burned after a Christian was alleged to have made blasphemous remarks. On 22 September 2013, 75 Christians were killed in a suicide attack at the historic All Saints Church in the old quarter of the regional capital, Peshawar.

On 14 February 2014 Muslims stormed the Church building and attacked school property in Multan. They were led by Anwar Khushi, a Muslim gangster who struck a deal with the local people's spokesperson. They seized the Church property and displaced the people and deprived them of their building.

On 15 March 2015, two blasts took place at a Roman Catholic Church and a Christ Church during Sunday service at Youhanabad town of Lahore. At least 15 people were killed and seventy were wounded in the attacks.

On 27 March 2016, at least 70 were killed and over 340 wounded when a suicide bomber targeting Christians celebrating Easter attacked a playground in Lahore. The Pakistani Taliban claimed responsibility for the bombing.

On 17 December 2017, a bomb killed nine and injured fifty-seven. The Islamic State of Iraq and the Levant took responsibility.

Forced conversions of Christian children are known to occur, and if a child resists, they can be raped, beaten, or bullied.

By province

Gallery

Missionaries accompanied colonizing forces from Portugal, France, and Great Britain. Jesuit missionaries sent from their Portuguese-held Goa built a Catholic church in Lahore, the first in Punjab, around 1597, two years after being granted permission by emperor Akbar, who had called them to his court in Fatehpur Sikri for religious discussions. This church was later demolished, perhaps during Aurangzeb times. Later on, Christianity was mainly brought by the British rulers of India in the later 18th and 19th  century. This is evidenced in cities established by the British, such as the port city of Karachi, where the majestic St. Patrick's Cathedral, one of Pakistan's largest church, stands, and the churches in the city of Rawalpindi, where the British established a major military cantonment.

The Europeans won small numbers of converts to Anglicanism, Methodism, the Lutheran Church and Catholicism from the native populations. Islam was very strong in the provinces of Punjab, Balochistan and the North West Frontier Province, but small native communities of converts to Christianity were formed. The largest numbers came from resident officers of the British Army and the government. European and wealthy native Christians established colleges, churches, hospitals and schools in cities like Karachi, Lahore, Rawalpindi and Peshawar. There is a large Catholic Goan community in Karachi that was established when Karachi's infrastructure was developed by the British before World War II, and the Irish (who were subjects of the British Empire and formed a large part of the British Army) were an important factor in the establishment of then the Catholic community of northwestern colonial India (now Pakistan).

Notable Christians

Christians in Pakistani military services

The Christians in Pakistan have long been active in various fields of public service. Many Christians have served in the Pakistan Armed Forces, civilian services and other organizations. Some have received high civilian and military awards.

Pakistan Air Force

Air Commodore Patrick Desmond Callaghan (1945-1971)
Group Captain Cecil Chaudhry
Squadron Leader Peter Christy
Air Vice Marshal Eric Gordon Hall (1947-1977)
Air Commodore Nazir Latif
Wing Commander Mervyn L. Middlecoat
Air Vice Marshal Michael John O'Brian

Pakistan Army

 Brigadier Daniel Austin
 Brigadier Mervyn Cardoza
 Lieutenant Colonel Derek Joseph
 Major General Julian Peter
 Major General Noel Israel Khokhar
 Brigadier Samson Simon Sharaf

Pakistan Navy
Rear-Admiral Leslie Mungavin

Religious ministers

 Rt. Rev. Samuel Robert Azariah (Moderator of the Church of Pakistan and Bishop in Raiwind)
 Bishop Andrew Francis, former Bishop of Multan in Pakistan
 Anthony Theodore Lobo, awarded the Presidential Pride of Performance Award in 1990 for services to the cause of literature and education.
 Bishop Azad Marshall (President of the National Council of Churches of Pakistan)
 Francis Nadeem, awarded Tamgha-e-Imtiaz for Public Service.

Civil services and police

 Cincinnatus Fabian D'Abreo, administrator and politician
 Dilshad Najmuddin ex IG Police and former ambassador
 Kamran Michael, senator who served as Minister for Statistics and a member of the Pakistan Muslim League (Nawaz) (PML-N)
 Manuel Misquita, former mayor of Karachi.
 Shahbaz Bhatti, member of the National Assembly and a member of the Pakistan Peoples Party (PPP) and Federal Minister for Minorities Affairs from 2008 - 2011.

Education

Riffat Arif, teacher, women's activist and philanthropist from Gujranwala.
Bernadette Louise Dean, academic and educator.
Jacqueline Maria Dias, professor of nursing at the Aga Khan University.
Norma Fernandes, teacher awarded the Tamgha-i-Imtiaz for her services to education.
Mary Emily Gonsalves, awarded the Sitara-e-Imtiaz in recognition of her services to education.
Yolande Henderson, veteran high school teacher.
Oswald Bruno Nazareth, high school teacher for 50 years.

Politicians
Clement Shahbaz Bhatti, Federal Minister for Minorities Affairs
Khalil Tahir Sandhu, Minister for Human Rights and Minorities Affairs (2008-2018) 
Kamran Michael, Federal Minister and Senator
Shunila Ruth, Member of National Assembly (2013-2018)
Aasiya Nasir, Member of National Assembly (2002-2018)

Human rights defenders
Dr. Rubina Feroze Bhatti, Member, National Commission on the Rights of the Child
Romana Bashir, Member, Punjab Commission on the Status of Women (2014-2018)

Entertainment 

 Alycia Dias, Playback singer.
 Azekah Daniel, Actress
 Bohemia, Rapper.
 Nirmal Roy, Musician and singer from Lahore.
 Sunita Marshall, Television actress and model.
 The Benjamin Sisters, Singer band consist of three sisters Nerrisa.
 Shae Gill, Pakistani singer and cover-artist, mostly known for her Punjabi duet song "Pasoori"
 Aniq Ernest, Pakistani Film Director, CEO Big Guns Productions

Sports

Jack Britto, Olympic field hockey player.
Ian Fyfe, cricketer, coach and a sports journalist from Karachi.
Jacob Harris, first class cricketer and sports coach from Karachi
Shazia Hidayat, track and field athlete. She was the only female athlete on the Pakistan team competing at the 2000 Olympics in Sydney, Australia.
John Permal, 1964-74 the fastest human in Pakistan.
Sidra Sadaf, woman cyclist who won a silver medal at the 11th South Asian Games in Dhaka, Bangladesh in January 2010.
Yousaf Youhana, first class Test Cricketer who used to openly use the sign of the cross before starting his innings. He was one of the most successful batsmen of the Pakistan Cricket Team. He later converted to Islam.

Writers 

Cyril Almeida, journalist and an assistant editor for the daily newspaper Dawn.
Kanwal Feroze, scholar, poet, writer and journalist.
Omer Shahid Hamid wrote the novel The Prisoner, which tells the story of a Christian police officer in Karachi.
Mohammed Hanif wrote the novel Our Lady of Alice Bhatti about a Christian nurse in Karachi.
Late Begum Bilquis Sheikh was an aristocratic Pakistani lady who converted from Islam to Christianity and wrote her famous memoirs about this. 
 
 Nabeel Qureshi a former Ahmadi who converted to Christianity, wrote three books. Seeking Allah, Finding Jesus: A Devout Muslim Encounters Christianity, Answering Jihad: A Better Way Forward and No God BUT One: Allah or Jesus.

Other

Sunny Benjamin John, singer from Karachi.
Quentin D'Silva, former Chairman & Chief Executive of Shell Pakistan Limited.

Candidates to sainthood 

 Akash Bashir, former student of the Don Bosco Technical Institute in Lahore, security guard and martyr. On 31 January 2022 Pope Francis declared him a Servant of God. He is the first native Pakistani candidate for sainthood in the history of the Catholic Church in Pakistan.

See also

 Christianity in Punjab, Pakistan
 List of churches in Pakistan
 Demographics of Pakistan
 2009 Gojra riots
 Asia Bibi blasphemy case
 Blasphemy in Pakistan
 Religion in Pakistan
 Freedom of religion in Pakistan
 Persecution of Christians in Pakistan
 Forced conversion of minority girls in Pakistan
 Religious discrimination in Pakistan

References

Works cited

Further reading

External links

 
 British Pakistani Christian Association
 Pakistan Christians demand help
 Open Doors USA's information about Pakistan
 Open Doors USA's information about Pakistan
 World Watch List - Pakistan
 Pakistan Christian News - Christians in Pakistan
 Centre for legal aid assistance and settlement
 Forced conversions in Pakistan: A dark reality

 
History of Christianity in Pakistan